Anwar Rasheed Entertainment is an Indian film production and distribution company established by director-producer Anwar Rasheed.

Films

References

External links

Film production companies of Kerala
Companies based in Kochi